The 2019–20 Kennesaw State Owls men's basketball team represented Kennesaw State University in the 2019–20 NCAA Division I men's basketball season. The Owls, led by first-year head coach Amir Abdur-Rahim, played their home games at the KSU Convocation Center in Kennesaw, Georgia as members of the Atlantic Sun Conference. They finished the season 1–28, 0–16 in ASUN play to finish in last place. They failed to qualify for the ASUN tournament.

Previous season
The Owls finished the 2018–19 season 6–26 overall, 3–13 in ASUN play to finish in a tie for 8th place, and due to their tiebreaker over Stetson, they qualified for the conference tournament. In the ASUN tournament, they lost in the first round to top-seeded Lipscomb.

On February 21, 2019, head coach Al Skinner announced his resignation from Kennesaw State effective at the end of the season. On April 18, 2019, Amir Abdur-Rahim was announced as Skinner's replacement.

Roster

Schedule and results

|-
!colspan=12 style=| Non-conference regular season

|-
!colspan=9 style=| Atlantic Sun Conference regular season

|-

Source

References

Kennesaw State Owls men's basketball seasons
Kennesaw State Owls
Kennesaw State Owls men's basketball
Kennesaw State Owls men's basketball